The British Fluid Power Association is a trade association in the United Kingdom that represents the hydraulic and pneumatic equipment industry, utilising properties of fluid power.

History
It started in 1959 as AHEM, becoming BFPA in 1986. A division of the organisation, the British Fluid Power Distributors Association (BFPDA) was formed in 1989.

Structure
It is based in Chipping Norton in Oxfordshire, just off the northern spur of the A44 in the north-east of the town. There are three types of membership: Full, Associate and Education.

Function
It acts as a marketing organisation (mostly abroad) for the industry and collects industry-wide statistics. Its technical committees also help in implementation and origination of standards for the BSI Group.

It represents companies involved with:
 Electrohydraulics (e.g.power steering)
 Pneumatic controls
 Motion control
 Linear motion
 Hydraulic accumulators
 Hydraulic pumps and Hydraulic motors
 Valves
 Pneumatic and hydraulic cylinders
 Hydraulic seals
 Hose and fittings
 Marketing and industry statistical information

See also
 National Fluid Power Association
 International Association of Hydraulic Engineering and Research

References

External links
 BFPA
 IFPEX

Hydraulic engineering organizations
Organisations based in Oxfordshire
West Oxfordshire District
Organizations established in 1959
Fluid power
Trade associations based in the United Kingdom
1959 establishments in the United Kingdom